Meet You at the Jazz Corner of the World is a two-volume Blue Note live album featuring the Jazz Messengers with the leader/drummer Art Blakey, trumpeter Lee Morgan, tenor saxophonist Wayne Shorter, pianist Bobby Timmons and bassist Jymie Merritt. The album was recorded on September 14, 1960 at Birdland, a jazz club in New York City. Volume 1 was first released in July 1961, with Volume 2 following in May 1962.  In 2002, the two LPs were reissued as a double-CD set.

Reception
Allmusic reviewer Lindsay Planer states that "The syncopated and infectiously rhythmic "Night Watch" is highlighted by Shorter, as he begins to fully grasp his improvisational skills that seem to materialize right before the keen-eared listener. He is quickly developing into the undaunted instrumentalist who would revolutionize modern jazz with Miles Davis in the mid-'60s". The 2002 Rudy Van Gelder Edition CD re-issued by Blue Note was given 4 out of 5 stars saying " Birdland (aka "the jazz corner of the world") produced some of Art Blakey's (drums) most revered live recordings...the 2002 complete Meet You at the Jazz Corner of the World would be a welcome addition to the library of most any jazz lover."

The numbers
The set consists mainly of standards, and three compositions from former Messenger Hank Mobley. Morgan and Shorter offer one tune each, and both volumes are rounded off by the ubiquitous Miles Davis set closer "The Theme".

Track listing

Volume 1
"What Know" (Morgan) - 10:26
"The Opener" (Mobley) - 8:29
"Round About Midnight" (Hanighen, Monk, Williams) - 9:44
"The Breeze and I" (Lecuona, Stillman) - 10:38
"The Theme" (Davis) - 1:37

Volume 2
"High Modes" (Mobley) - 13:09
"Night Watch" (Mobley) - 8:34
"The Things I Love" (Barlow, Lew Harris) - 8:26
"The Summit" (Shorter) - 9:26
"The Theme" (Davis) - 1:35

Personnel
Art Blakey - drums
Lee Morgan - trumpet
Wayne Shorter - tenor saxophone
Bobby Timmons - piano
Jymie Merritt - bass
Pee Wee Marquette - master of ceremonies/announcer

Production
Alfred Lion - producer
Rudy Van Gelder - original recording engineer and 2002 remastering

References

Art Blakey live albums
The Jazz Messengers live albums
1960 live albums
Live instrumental albums
Albums produced by Alfred Lion
Blue Note Records live albums